Sibusiso Khumalo (born 8 March 1991) is a South African footballer who currently plays as a midfielder.

Career
He is a product of the Swallows youth system. Kumalo was promoted to the first team in the 2010–11 season and became a regular feature for the first team squad, being used mostly as a substitute.

As of March 2019, Khumalo remained with the Sundowns team. However, he was released in September 2019.

References

External links

1991 births
Living people
People from Katlehong
Sportspeople from Gauteng
South African soccer players
Association football midfielders
Moroka Swallows F.C. players
Mamelodi Sundowns F.C. players
Maritzburg United F.C. players
Jomo Cosmos F.C. players
Bidvest Wits F.C. players
Futuro Kings FC players
Marumo Gallants F.C. players
South African Premier Division players
South Africa international soccer players
South African expatriate soccer players
South African expatriates in Equatorial Guinea
Expatriate footballers in Equatorial Guinea